Thomas George Sanner (born May 20, 1994) is an American soccer player.

Career

Youth, College and Amateur
Sanner played four years of college soccer at Princeton University between 2012 and 2015. In his senior year, Sanner was named Ivy League Offensive Player of the Year, NSCAA First Team All-East Region, First Team All-Ivy League and First Team All-ECAC.

Professional
On January 14, 2016, Sanner was selected in the second round (36th overall) of the 2016 MLS SuperDraft by Vancouver Whitecaps FC. He signed with the Whitecaps United Soccer League affiliate on June 17, 2016.

References

External links

Princeton Tigers bio

1994 births
Living people
American soccer players
American expatriate soccer players
Association football forwards
Princeton Tigers men's soccer players
Whitecaps FC 2 players
Soccer players from Indianapolis
Expatriate soccer players in Canada
Vancouver Whitecaps FC draft picks
USL Championship players
American expatriate sportspeople in Canada